OCT East is a major entertainment and resort complex in Yantian, Shenzhen, China. Construction started in 2004 and it was opened in 2007. It is divided into 3 theme parks, namely Knight Valley, Tea Stream Resort Valley and Wind Valley and features 8 hotels and a Buddhist Temple.

On 29 June 2010, a malfunction at a rocket ride killed six and injured ten. According to one victim, first responders took 20 minutes to reach her.

See also
Wood Coaster (Mountain Flyer), a roller coaster in Knight Valley
Dameisha Beach, a neighboring beach resort
List of parks in Shenzhen

References

Yantian District
Amusement parks in Shenzhen
Geography of Shenzhen